The 2013–14 season was Portsmouth's first campaign back in the Football League Two after being relegated from League One the previous season. This was the first time that Portsmouth played in the fourth tier of English football since the 1979–80 season.

Players

Squad details

1 Signed a new deal before the latest administration.

Transfers

In

Total spending:  £0

Trialists

Out

Total gaining:  £0

Contracts

1 According to Whatmough's Twitter account.

Events
2013
24 April: Portsmouth appoint caretaker manager Guy Whittingham for permanent role, with a one-year contract.
25 April: Jed Wallace signed a one-year contract extension with Portsmouth.
29 April: Portsmouth announce partnership with Sondico.
1 May: Andy Awford refused an assistant manager role to stick with Academy.
2 May: Jed Wallace and Adam Webster receive an England U19 call up.
4 May: Patrick Agyemang becomes Portsmouth's first summer signing, with a two-year deal.
9 May: Portsmouth signs Sonny Bradley, Danny East and Romain Padovani.
13 May: Portsmouth signs Tom Craddock in a two-year deal.
14 May: Portsmouth signs Joe Devera in a two-year deal.
15 May: Portsmouth extends partnership with Jobsite until the end of the season.
16 May: Portsmouth signs John Sullivan in a two-year deal.
17 May: Portsmouth presents their new home kit for the season.
20 May: Portsmouth signs Andy Barcham in a three-year deal.
23 May: Portsmouth appoints Head of Sports Performance Steve Allen as assistant manager.
21 June: Portsmouth sign Ricky Holmes in a two-year deal.
26 June: Portsmouth strikes a one-year deal with University of Portsmouth, to use Langstone Campus facilities as training field.
8 July: Portsmouth appoints former player Alan McLoughlin as first team coach.
23 July: Portsmouth signs Ryan Bird in a one-year deal, after a trial with the club.
25 July: Portsmouth signs Simon Ferry in a two-year deal.
25 November: Guy Whittingham is sacked after a string of poor results and performances, and Andy Awford is elected caretaker.
9 December: Richie Barker is appointed the new Portsmouth manager, with Steve Coppell being appointed Director of Football.
2014
14 February: Portsmouth signs lifelong fan Rob Phillips until the end of the season, after Phillips won a Papa John's Sign For Your Club competition.
27 March: Richie Barker is sacked after a string of poor results and performances which left the club only two points above relegation, and Andy Awford is elected caretaker again.
1 May: After remaining six games unbeaten and leaving the club clear of relegation, Andy Awford is appointed as the new Portsmouth's permanent manager, signing a one-year contract.

Player statistics

Squad stats

|-
|colspan="14"|Players on loan to other clubs:
|-

|-
|colspan="14"|Players who have left the club after the start of the season:

|}

Top scorers

Disciplinary record

1 Adding one yellow card received during the cancelled match against Wycombe.

Injuries

Competition

Pre-season

Football League Trophy

Football League Cup

FA Cup

League Two

Results summary

Results by round

Matches

References

Portsmouth
Portsmouth F.C. seasons